Gyrophaena is a genus of rove beetles in the family Staphylinidae. There are more than 160 described species in Gyrophaena.

See also
 List of Gyrophaena species

References

Further reading

External links

 

Aleocharinae
Articles created by Qbugbot